Erin Marie Hogan (born September 22, 1985) is an American actress and activist from St. Louis, Missouri. Hogan is mostly seen in direct-to-video horror films and American cable television. She is a mental health advocate, who in 2015 announced that she battles depression and anxiety.

Early life
Born near The Hill, in St. Louis, Missouri, to parents Michael Patrick and Jane Christine Hogan. Hogan began singing, acting, and dancing at a young age. She was enrolled in the Ballet Conservatory of Saint Louis where she studied before moving to COCA to continue her training. During high school at Soldan International Studies High School, Hogan began singing competitively and performing in community and underground theatre. She later received her degree in Film and Video Production from Webster University with a minor in Music. During these years, Hogan worked as a theme park performer, competitive singer, and aerial artist.

Career
After moving to Los Angeles to pursue acting further, She first came to attention with her role as Samantha Finley in Paranormal Entity (2009), a "mockbuster" exploiting the publicity of the 2007 film Paranormal Activity. The film was done in a “found footage” style, causing a bit of confusion as many people believed she was actually dead.

On television, Hogan appeared on five episodes of the 2015 season of Ray Donovan. In film, she featured in one of the six segments of The Theatre Bizarre (2011) and starred in Hold Your Breath (2012). Her portrayal of Linda Kasabian in House of Manson (2015) earned her positive reviews on horror websites. She received positive reviews for her role in the paranormal thriller "Dwelling," with many reviewers hailing her portrayal of "Ellie" as her best performance to date.

Filmography

Film

Television

Discography

References

External links
 
 

1985 births
Living people
Actresses from St. Louis
21st-century American women